The following is a list of notable people from Karlovac and the geographical area of present-day Karlovac County.

Artists, musicians and actors

 Zrinka Cvitešić (1979), theater, film and television actress
 Darko Domijan (1952), pop singer
 Zvonimír Eichler (1903–1975), painter
 Vjekoslav Karas (1821–1858), painter
 Alfred Freddy Krupa, (born 1971) painter
 John Malkovich (born 1953), actor whose paternal grandparents were from Ozalj
 Carla Martinis (1922–2010), soprano
 Boris Mutić (1939–2009), sports journalist and television commentator
 Vladimir Pogačić (1919–1999), film director
 Barbara Radulović (born 1982), TV host
 Slava Raškaj (1877–1906), painter
 Božidar Širola (1889–1956), composer, musicologist
 Dejan Šorak (born 1954), film director
 Miroslav Šutej (1936–2005), designer

Authors

 Ivana Brlić-Mažuranić (1874–1938), writer
 Ulderiko Donadini (1894–1923), novelist, dramatist, short story writer
 Dragojla Jarnević (1812–1874), writer and poet
 Juraj Križanić (1618–1683), writer, earliest recorded pan-slavist
 Irena Lukšić (1953–2019), writer and translator

Military leaders

 Edgar Angeli (1892–1945), rear admiral
 Anton Csorich (1795–1864), nobleman and general
 Ivan Gošnjak (1909–1980), general, secretary of defence of Yugoslavia
 Roza Miletić (born 1934), veteran of Croatian war of Independence
 Pavao Miljavac (born 1953), army general
 Omar Pasha (1806–1871), field marshal
 Petar Stipetić (1937–2018), general

Musicians

 Davor Gobac (born 1964), singer of the group Psihomodo pop
 Ema Pukšec (1834–1889), soprano opera singer
 Ana Vidović (born 1980), Silvije Vidović and Viktor Vidović (1973), academic musicians
 Viktor Vidović (born 1973), guitarist

Politicians

 Elvira Abdić-Jelenović (born 1967), politician 
 Ivan Banjavčić (1843–1913), mayor of Karlovac
 Josip Boljkovac (1920–2014), politician, Minister of the Interior
 Nikolina Brnjac (born 1978), politician, Ministry of Tourism and Sports of Croatia
 Većeslav Holjevac (1917–1970), mayor of Zagreb
 Daniel Ivin (1932–2021), politician, activist, writer
 Fran Krsto Frankopan (1643–1671), politician, nobleman and writer
 Josip Kregar (1953–2020), politician, Mayor of Zagreb
 Miroslav Lazanski (1950–2021), military analyst, politician and a diplomat, ambassador of Serbia to Russia
 Miodrag Linta (born 1969), politician and activist
 Blaž Lorković (1839–1892), economist, lawyer
 Ivan Vilibor Sinčić (born 1990), President of the Living Wall
 Ivan Ribar (1881–1968), politician
 Ivan Šubašić (1892–1955), politician, last Ban of Croatia
 Branko Vukelić (1958–2013), politician, 11th Minister of Defence of Croatia
 Nikola Vuljanić (born 1949), politician, member of the European Parliament for Croatia

Historians, intellectuals, scientists

 Vladimir Goldner (1933–2017), physician and professor
 Ljudevit Jonke (1907–1979), linguist
 Božidar Liščić (born 1929), engineer, member of the Croatian Academy of Sciences and Arts
 Radoslav Lopašić (1835–1893), historian
 Gojko Nikoliš (1911–1995), physician and historian
 Anđelko Milardović (born 1956), political scientist
 Sava Mrkalj (1783–1833), linguist, grammarian, philologist, poet
 Gajo Petrović (1927–1993), philosopher
 Elza Polak (1910–1995), horticulturist 
 Ivo Protulipac, physician, a lawyer, and an important Catholic activist
 Vanja Sutlić (1925–1989), philosopher
 Živko Vrcelj (born 1959), doctor and politicians

Athletes 

 Bill Belichick (born 1952) and Steve Belichick (1919–2005) football coaches born in the U.S., whose ancestors were from near Karlovac
 Goran Bunjevčević (born 1973), Serbian football player
 Luka Cindrić (born 1993), handball player
 Miloš Hrstić (born 1955), former footballer for HNK Rijeka and Yugoslavia's national team
 Peter Kokotowitsch (1890–1968), wrestler
 Simeon Kosanović (born 1933), former basketball and handball player
 Jurica Lakić (1953–1982), handball player who played for RK Zamet and Yugoslavia's national team
 Željko Kosanović (born 1934), former basketball and handball player
 Kristijan Lovrić (born 1955), footballer
 Snježana Mijić (born 1971), volleyball player
 Milan Neralić (1875–1918), fencer, won a bronze medal at the Olympics
 Ante Pavić (born 1989), tennis player
 Jelica Pavličić-Štefančić ( Slunj, 1954), athlete, multiple champion of Yugoslavia in the 100m, 200m and 400m; 400 m world record holder 
 Željko Perušić (1936–2017), football player who played for Dinamo Zagreb and Yugoslavia
 Predrag Počuča (born 1986), football player
 Antun Stipančić (1949–1991), table tennis player

Religion

 Mile Bogović, titular bishop of Tamata and diocesan bishop of Gospić-Senj
 Branko Dobrosavljević, Serbian Orthodox priest killed during ethnic cleansing in WW2
 Maksimilijan Vrhovac (1752–1827), Bishop of Zagreb

Other
 Jelka Glumičić (1941–2020). activist
 Mirko and Stjepan Seljan (1871 – 20th century) (1875–1936), explorers
 Ilona Zrínyi (1643–1707), daughter of Petar Zrinski
 Katarina Zrinska (1625–1673), influential woman from the Frankopan family

References

 
Karlovac County